Cylindera is a genus of tiger beetles native to the Palearctic, the Near East and northern Africa. It was a result of the breakup of the Cicindela genus, and the status of Cylindera as a genus or a subgenus of the genus Cicindela is in dispute.

See also
 List of Cylindera species

References

Further reading

External links